Max Richardson (born 24 December 1948) is a former Australian rules footballer who played for Collingwood Football Club during the 1970s before finishing his career at Fitzroy Football Club. 

The younger brother of Wayne, Collingwood recruited Richardson from Western Australian Football League club South Fremantle and went on to captain the club in 1977. He usually played as a ruck rover or on the half back line.

External links

1948 births
Living people
Australian rules footballers from Western Australia
Collingwood Football Club players
Fitzroy Football Club players
South Fremantle Football Club players
Western Australian State of Origin players